Scott Columbus (November 10, 1956 – April 5, 2011) was an American drummer, best known for his long period of collaboration with heavy metal band Manowar.

Biography
Born Walter Scott Columbus, youngest of four children, two brothers Anthony & Tom and a sister Marilyn.  Son of John A. Columbus and Amelia Columbus. He began to play the drums at age 6. Later on, during his 20s, grew up listening to such bands as Led Zeppelin, the Who, Black Sabbath and Cream while he would play in local bands such as Hell Hostage.  Columbus was known to be loving and funny, often made jokes and was fun to be around.  He was a huge Philadelphia Eagles fan and would often dress up as a football player as a quarterback or running back.  At age 25, he was discovered by a female fan of the power metal band Manowar, beating aluminium in a local foundry.   Columbus starred on his first album which is known as Manowar's second album Into Glory Ride, made his debut with the band on the Song Warlord.  Then starred on several of their upcoming albums such as Hail to England, Sign of the Hammer, Fighting the World and Kings of Metal. He was replaced by Rhino for The Triumph of Steel. Between the years he was out of Manowar, Columbus was in a local band of Gunshy and worked at a horse radish plant. Columbus returned for Manowar's album, Louder than Hell he then remained with the band for the albums Warriors of the World and Gods of War.  During the summer of 2008 when he was replaced once again by Rhino during Manowar's performances in Bulgaria and Magic Circle Festival 2008.

Columbus stated in his interview he was working on a solo project instrumental but was never released, and was playing with Ross the Boss and a local band PSC.

Manowar never officially announced Columbus's departure in 2008. In an interview with Classic Rock magazine, Scott said "I'd say it was about April 2008. When Mr. DeMaio [Joey DeMaio, Manowar  bassist/frontman] and myself agreed to disagree on a few points of interest. That leads us up to today. You know what? I had a long and wonderful career with Manowar; I have no regrets, it's just life moves on." When asked about his departure in the early 1990s Scott said "It was the very end of 1989 leading into 1990. I was officially gone in 1990, the first time. I can just tell you and the world that my son was never sick. So you can deduce from that what you may. However, that's what I'll tell you [concerning the official statement]."

Columbus played the so-called "Drums of Doom", a kit made of stainless steel, because his drumming technique was too rough on standard kits which had to be replaced too regularly.

Personal life

Columbus was married to Kimmy Brett for less than a year.  They had one daughter together, Teresa J (Columbus) Burgdorf.

In 1981, he was married to Victoria A. Columbus and was together for 17 years with two sons, Scott and Anthony Columbus.  Divorced in 1998.

Married to Kathy Recupito in 1998, then divorced in 2008.  They had one son together, Corey Columbus.

Death
On April 5, 2011, Manowar announced on their official Facebook account and official website that Scott Columbus died, with no cause of death given at the time: "With great sorrow we announce the passing of our brother Scott Columbus. 
We know he is in a good place and at peace. He will never be forgotten.
Your family and brothers, Joey, Eric, Karl, Donnie. And all at Magic Circle Music".

On April 5, 2020, the ninth anniversary of his death, Columbus' daughter Teresa publicly announced that her father's cause of death was suicide, and urged for more awareness on mental illness and depression.

See also
Manowar discography

References

External links
Official Manowar website

1956 births
2011 suicides
American heavy metal drummers
Manowar members
Place of birth missing